The Duet free routine competition of the 2020 European Aquatics Championships was held on 11 and 14 May 2021.

Results
The preliminary round was held on 11 May at 09:00. The final was held on 14 May at 09:00.

Green denotes finalists

References

Duet free routine